Ternium S.A. is a manufacturer of flat and long steel products with production centers in Argentina, Brazil, Mexico, Guatemala, Colombia, and the United States. It is the leading steel company in Latin America with highly integrated processes to manufacture steel and value-added products. Along with Nippon Steel and Companhia Siderúrgica Nacional, Ternium owns Usiminas of Brazil. The company has an annual production capacity of 12.4 million tons.

The company takes its name from the Latin words Ter (three) and Eternium (eternal) in reference to the integration of the three steel mills.

History
Ternium was formed in 2005 by the consolidation of three companies: Siderar of Argentina, Sidor of Venezuela and Hylsa of Mexico. Siderar was established by Argentine-based industrial conglomerate Techint in 1992 following the privatization of Somisa.

In 2007, Ternium acquired Grupo IMSA, thereby expanding its operations into Guatemala and the United States.

Ternium was listed on the NYSE on February 1, 2006.

Nationalization of Sidor by Venezuelan government
Ternium's Venezuelan subsidiary, Sidor, was nationalized by the Venezuelan government following an April 2008 resolution of the National Assembly of Venezuela. This move followed a series of worker disputes over pay which had paralyzed the company. In early 2009, compensation of US$1.65 billion was agreed on for the nationalization of Ternium's 59.7% stake, with Ternium keeping a 10% stake in the company.

References

Iron and steel mills
Steel companies of Luxembourg
Companies listed on the Buenos Aires Stock Exchange
Companies listed on the New York Stock Exchange
Manufacturing companies of Argentina
Manufacturing companies of Mexico
Companies established in 2005
Companies based in Luxembourg City
Techint